Jade is a given name derived from the ornamental stone jade, which is used in artwork and in jewellery-making. The name is derived from the Spanish piedra de la ijada, which means "stone of the bowels."  There was a belief that when jade was placed on the stomach, it could cure colic in babies. The stone is greatly valued in Asian countries. Confucius believed it had properties encouraging purity, bravery, and honesty. Chinese emperors were buried in suits made of the stone because they believed it would make them live on forever.

The name has been used for both boys and girls in the United States and currently ranks among the top 1,000 names for American girls. It ranked among the 1,000 most common names for boys born in the United States throughout the mid-1990s. In the mid-1990s, Jade was among the top 25 most popular names for girls in England and Wales. It was also among the most common names for girls in Scotland, France, Ireland, Belgium, Canada, Australia, and Northern Ireland in recent years. Jada, a variant of the name, was also a popular name for girls born in the United States and Canada in recent years. Jayda, a spelling variant, was also a popular name in recent years in the United States. Spelling variant Jaida is also in use for American girls. Giada, an Italian variant of the name, was also well used in the United States. Jaden, also a popular name for boys and girls in the United States with multiple spelling variants, is also sometimes seen as a variant of Jade.

People with the given name

Women
 Jade Alleyne (born 2001), Scottish actress
 Jade Anderson (born 1980), British singer
 Jade Baraldo (born 1998), Brazilian singer
 Jade Barbosa (born 1991), Brazilian gymnast
 Jade Bowler (born 2000), British YouTuber known as Unjaded Jade
 Jade Brooks, Canadian author
 Jade Carey (born 2000), American gymnast
 Jade Cole (born 1979), American model
 Jade Holland Cooper (born 1986/87), British fashion designer
 Jade Edmistone (born 1982), Australian swimmer
 Jade Ewen (born 1988), British singer and actress
 Jade Goody (1981–2009), British reality star
 Jade Howard (born 1995), Zambian swimmer
 Jade Jagger (born 1971), daughter of Mick Jagger
 Jade Johnson (born 1980), English long jumper
 Jade Jones (athlete) (born 1996), English wheelchair racer
 Jade Jones (taekwondo) (born 1993), Welsh taekwondo athlete 
 Jade Kwan (born 1979), Hong Kong Cantopop singer
 Jade MacRae (born 1979), Australian singer
 Jade Raymond (born 1975), Canadian video game producer and executive
 Jade Seah (born 1983), Singaporean actress and model
 Jade Thirlwall (born 1992), English singer and member of British girl group Little Mix 
 Jade Villalon (born 1980), American singer and member of German music project Sweetbox
 Jade Windley (born 1990), British tennis player
 Jade Snow Wong (1922–2006), Chinese-American ceramic artist and writer
 Jade Bird (born 1997), English singer-songwriter

Men
 Jade C. Bell, Canadian quadriplegic actor
 Jade Buford (born 1988), American racing driver
 Jade Dernbach (born 1986), South African-born England cricketer
 Jade Esteban Estrada (born 1975), American actor
 Jade Gatt (born 1978), Australian actor
 Jade Gresham (born 1997), Australian footballer
 Jade Kindar-Martin (born 1974), American circus performer
 Jade Jones (singer) (born 1979), British singer and chef
 Jade North (born 1982), Australian football player
 Jade Puget (born 1973), American musician and producer
 Jade Rawlings (born 1977), Australian footballer
 Jade Yorker (born 1985), American actor
 Lucas Jade Zumann (born 2000), American actor

Fictional characters
 Cheshire (comics), DC Comics supervillainess Jade Nguyen
 Jade, a character in the movie 2009 American comedy film The Hangover
 Jade (comics), a DC Comics superheroine
 Jade (Beyond Good & Evil), main protagonist of the video game Beyond Good & Evil
 Jade (Mortal Kombat), in the Mortal Kombat video game series
Jade/The Indigo Child, in the Fahrenheit (a.k.a. Indigo Prophecy) video game
 Jade (El Clon), in the Telemundo television series El Clon
 Jade Chan, Jackie's niece in the animated TV series Jackie Chan Adventures
 Jade Mitchell, in the Australian soap opera Neighbours
 Jade Sutherland, in the Australian soap opera Home and Away'
 Jade Albright, in the British soap opera Hollyoaks Jade West, a main character in the American TV sitcom series Victorious Jade, a character in the Shadow Raiders TV series
 Jade (Kinnikuman), in the anime series Ultimate Muscle Jade, in the manga series Land of the Lustrous and the TV series based on it
Jade Curtiss, in Tales of the Abyss Jade, from The Prophecy of the Stones novel
 Jade Fontaine, a character of the PvP webcomic
 Jade Harley, from the Homestuck webcomic
 Jade Wilson from the Teen Titans Go! To the Movies film
 Jade Vernon, from the Traces series of books
 Jade, a kept man in the King Crimson song Cadence and Cascade Jade, a character from the 2017 video game Dragon Quest XI Jade, the namesake and mascot character of a YouTube music channel
 Jade, a character in the Bratz toyline
 Jade, a playable character in the video game Fire Emblem Engage''

Notes

English feminine given names
English given names
Given names derived from gemstones